Abad railway station is located in Abad village, Jacobabad district of Sindh province of the Pakistan.

See also
 List of railway stations in Pakistan
 Pakistan Railways

References

Railway stations in Jacobabad District
Railway stations on Rohri–Chaman Railway Line
Railway stations on Kotri–Attock Railway Line (ML 2)
Railway stations in Sindh